Jan Škarnitzl (born 11 July 1986) is a Czech cross-country mountain biker. At the 2012 Summer Olympics, he competed in the Men's cross-country at Hadleigh Farm, finishing in 12th place.

References

1986 births
Living people
Czech male cyclists
Cross-country mountain bikers
Olympic cyclists of the Czech Republic
Cyclists at the 2012 Summer Olympics
Cyclists at the 2016 Summer Olympics
People from Brandýs nad Labem-Stará Boleslav
Sportspeople from the Central Bohemian Region